The men's 3000 metres steeplechase at the 1974 European Athletics Championships was held in Rome, Italy, at Stadio Olimpico on 4 and 7 September 1974.

Medalists

Results

Final
7 September

Heats
4 September

Heat 1

Heat 2

Heat 3

Participation
According to an unofficial count, 24 athletes from 15 countries participated in the event.

 (2)
 (2)
 (1)
 (1)
 (3)
 (1)
 (1)
 (2)
 (1)
 (1)
 (1)
 (2)
 (1)
 (3)
 (2)

References

3000 metres steeplechase
Steeplechase at the European Athletics Championships